Byttinger is a 1991 Norwegian drama film directed by Sigve Endresen, starring Bjarte Hjelmeland and Stig Henrik Hoff. A group of seven inner-city youths are given the choice between prison and a rehabilitation camp in the countryside. The two social workers who follow them there believe that the fresh air and beautiful scenery will have a positive influence on the kids. During an excursion to a glacier the group gets trapped, and the kids have to use all their street smarts to get out.

External links
 
 
 The Changelings (Byttinger) at the Norwegian Film Institute

1991 films
1991 drama films
Norwegian drama films